Children's Palace station is a station on Line 3 and Line 4 of the Shenzhen Metro. It opened on 28 December 2004. The Line 3 platforms opened on 28 June 2011. It is located under the south of Lotus Hill in Futian District, Shenzhen, China. It is adjacent to Shenzhen Children's Palace.

Formerly known in English by its pinyin transliteration Shaoniangong, Children's Palace was the northern terminus of Line 4, before its extension to Qinghu in the north of Shenzhen was completed in 2010.

Station structure
Children's Palace is an underground station with three levels. The two side platforms are located on the lower level, while the upper level being the station concourse.

Station layout

Exits

References

External links
 Shenzhen Metro Children's Palace Station (Line 3) (Chinese)
 Shenzhen Metro Children's Palace Station (Line 3) (English)
 Shenzhen Metro Children's Palace Station (Line 4) (Chinese)
 Shenzhen Metro Children's Palace Station (Line 4) (English)

Railway stations in Guangdong
Shenzhen Metro stations
Futian District
Railway stations in China opened in 2004